Sir Norman Winfrid Moore,      3rd Baronet (24 February 1923 – 21 October 2015) was a British conservationist and author who worked extensively on studies of dragonflies and their habitats and was one of the first people to observe and warn of the adverse effects of DDT and other organochlorine pesticides on wildlife. The Independent described him in his obituary as one of the most influential figures in nature conservation in the second half of the 20th century.

Early life and education 
Moore was born in London in 1923, the son of Sir Alan Hilary Moore, 2nd Baronet, of Hancox. He was educated at Eton College and Trinity College, Cambridge. He graduated during World War II, and then served in the Royal Artillery in the last two years of the war, reaching the rank of Lieutenant. He saw action in the Netherlands and Germany, was wounded, and became a prisoner of war.

After the war he married fellow zoologist Janet Singer (in 1950) and studied for a PhD at Bristol University, being awarded the doctorate in 1954. His PhD thesis was on agonistic behaviour.

Career 
From 1953, he was a scientific officer for the Nature Conservancy (later the Nature Conservancy Council) in various roles, including that of Chief Advisory Officer, until 1983. From 1979 to 1983, he was also Visiting Professor of Environmental Studies at Wye College, which was then part of the University of London. Moore is a founding member and former chairman of the Farming and Wildlife Advisory Group (FWAG), and is also a vice-president of the British Association of Nature Conservationists.

From 1960 to 1974 he was Head of the Toxic Chemicals and Wildlife Division at Monks Wood Experimental Station where he studied the effects of toxic chemicals on wildlife, in particular, the adverse effect of organochlorine pesticides on raptors. This work led to him developing the "precautionary principle" exemplified by his recommendation that the use of such pesticides should be phased out even though the extent of the harm they caused was not yet fully known. His pioneering work on nature conservation and his pesticide research led to requests for advice from governmental and other scientific organisations in Europe, India, Australia and the United States. It was his work on dragonflies and conservation that led to him coining the term "the birdwatcher's insect", aiming to raise public interest in the role of insect monitoring in ecosystem conservation. Due to his background in dragonfly research and conservation, Moore was invited to chair the Odonata specialist group of the IUCN Species Survival Commission. This international group first met in 1980, and produced a world plan for dragonfly conservation in 1995, which was published in 1997.

Moore contributed to two books in the New Naturalist series: Dragonflies (1960) and Hedges (1974), and his book on nature conservation, The Bird of Time (1987), his professional autobiography, won the Natural World Book of the Year award. Moore is also an Honorary Fellow of the Linnean Society, and an Honorary Fellow of the Royal Entomological Society, which also made him the inaugural recipient of the Marsh Entomological Award for Insect Conservation. Moore has also received the Stamford Raffles Award from the Zoological Society of London for his "distinguished contribution to the ecology and behaviour of dragonflies". His book, "Oaks, Dragonflies and People" (2002) charted the creation of a nature reserve and dragonfly pond at his home in Cambridgeshire.

In 2003, a festschrift issue of Odonatologica, the journal of the Societas Internationalis Odonatologica, was published to mark Moore's 80th birthday. This included a biography and a bibliography of his works. Several other tributes appeared around this time, including, in July 2004, a special tribute issue of the International Journal of Odonatology, titled "Guardians of the Watershed: Global Status of Dragonflies". The British Dragonfly Society administers an award in Moore's honour, called the 'Norman Moore Award Fund'. In addition to this, several species of dragonflies and damselflies are named after Moore.

He died on 21 October 2015 in Swavesey.

Selected publications
Dragonflies (1960), with P. S. Corbet and Cynthia Longfield
Hedges (1974), with E. Pollard and M. D. Hooper
The Bird of Time – the science and politics of nature conservation (1987)
Dragonflies: Status Survey and Conservation Action Plan (1997)
Oaks, Dragonflies and People (2002)

References

1923 births
2015 deaths
Alumni of the University of Bristol
Alumni of Trinity College, Cambridge
Baronets in the Baronetage of the United Kingdom
British Army personnel of World War II
English conservationists
New Naturalist writers
Odonatologists
People educated at Eton College
Pesticides in the United Kingdom
Royal Artillery officers
Academics of Wye College